Orchard City is a statutory town in Delta County, Colorado, United States. The population was 3,119 at the 2010 census. There are three post offices serving Orchard City: Austin (ZIP code 81410), Cory (ZIP code 81414), Eckert (ZIP code 81418).

Geography
Orchard City is located in central Delta County at  (38.816360, -107.976951). Colorado State Highway 65 passes through the town, leading southwest  to Delta, the county seat, and northeast  to the town of Cedaredge. Eckert is in the northern part of the town, and Cory is in the southwest, both along Highway 65. Austin is in the southeast corner of the town, on the north side of Colorado State Highway 92, which leads west  to Delta and east  to Hotchkiss.

History
In the early 20th century, because residents in the area were getting sick from drinking ditch water, three small communities (Austin, Cory, and Eckert) agreed to consolidate in order to be able to raise enough money to build a water pipeline. Thus Orchard City was incorporated in 1912, but even to this day it's more common for people to refer to one of the three specific communities within the boundaries of Orchard City. The community was named for an orchard near the original town site.

Government and politics

The Town of Orchard City is governed by a council of six elected at-large trustees and an independently elected mayor. Together, the mayor and trustees, form the government of the Town of Orchard City. The Board of Trustees typically meets twice a month for a work session and meeting.

In 1912, the first election saw George Williamson elected mayor, and the trustees were J.P. Kettle, George Weyrauch, E.E. White, William Start, E.J. Coffey, and Charles Dixon. The first Town Clerk was Ernest Sudgen.

In 1993, the Town of Orchard City and the Field of Dreams build a baseball park with the help of Colorado Great Outdoors Funds. By 2000, controversy over finances and maintenance resulted in the town developing an enterprise fund to directly manage the park.

In 2004, the ACE Citizens Committee, which included E.J. Verdahl, Jack Chaffee, and Robert Denton, was successful in a petition drive that led to the recall of Orchard City Trustee Katie Benson Schuster Sickles.

Prior to the recall election of April 2004, the Colorado District Court heard oral arguments in the case of Burgess v. Town of Orchard City, which examined whether David Burgess, candidate running against Trustee Schuster, satisfied the residential requirements in order to run. Trustee Schuster alleged that Burgess should not be certified to run, because he did not live in the town. Town Clerk Gio Garver refused to certify Burgess' petition because the town was not 100% certain where he lived. Burgess was remodelling his home and lived in a temporary trailer outside the town limits. The court held that Colorado Revised Statute 31-10-301 and the case of Theobald v. Byrns in which the Colorado Supreme Court interpreted domicile as being left up to the individual to choose which address they would make as their domicile, thus Mr. Burgess’ voter registration could be used to help determine domicile. David Burgess was defeated in his re-election bid in April 2006.

On Dec. 12, 2006, Mayor Tom Huerkamp survived a special recall election in which Guy Cooper challenged the incumbent. Under the Huerkamp Administration, the town built a $1.3 million town hall, ended a Prohibition Era ban on the sale of alcohol in town, and renamed most of the town's roads, along with removing highway signs referencing the unincorporated communities of Cory, Eckert and Austin. During the mid-2000s, Orchard City's board of trustees meetings were emotional events that packed dozens of citizens into the gallery and typically ended with sheriff's deputies separating Huerkamp loyalists from detractors. In April 2008, Mayor Huerkamp lost his re-election bid to then-trustee, Don Suppes.

In 2012, Trustee Matt Soper, at age 27, was elected the youngest trustee in the town's 100-year history.

On April 6, 2016, Trustee Ken Volgamore, who was appointed to fill the seat vacated by Trustee Soper, was elected mayor of Orchard City, defeating long time trustee, Jan Gage, 58% to 42%. The current Board of Trustees consists of Craig Fuller, Dick Kirkpatrick, Gynee Thomassen, Thomas H. Huerkamp (former mayor), Bob Eckels, and a vacancy created with the election of Trustee Volgamore to serve as mayor.

Demographics

As of the census of 2000, there were 2,880 people, 1,154 households, and 880 families residing in the town. The racial makeup of the town was 94.38% White, 0.07% African American, 0.97% Native American, 0.45% Asian, 0.07% Pacific Islander, 2.05% from other races, and 2.01% from two or more races. Hispanic or Latino of any race were 7.92% of the population.

There were 1,154 households, out of which 25.7% had children under the age of 18 living with them, 67.3% were married couples living together, 6.2% had a female householder with no husband present, and 23.7% were non-families. 20.9% of all households were made up of individuals, and 11.6% had someone living alone who was 65 years of age or older. The average household size was 2.41 and the average family size was 2.78.

In the town, the population was spread out, with 21.3% under the age of 18, 4.9% from 18 to 24, 19.7% from 25 to 44, 26.8% from 45 to 64, and 27.4% who were 65 years of age or older. The median age was 48 years. For every 100 females, there were 96.7 males. For every 100 females age 18 and over, there were 93.5 males.

The median income for a household in the town was $35,915, and the median income for a family was $40,257. Males had a median income of $30,938 versus $20,179 for females. The per capita income for the town was $17,636. About 5.5% of families and 9.3% of the population were below the poverty line, including 10.5% of those under age 18 and 12.5% of those age 65 or over.

See also

Outline of Colorado
Index of Colorado-related articles
State of Colorado
Colorado cities and towns
Colorado municipalities
Colorado counties
Delta County, Colorado

References

External links

 
 The Delta County Independent, the local community weekly covering Orchard City and the rest of Delta County
 CDOT map of the Town of Orchard City

Towns in Delta County, Colorado
Towns in Colorado